SWI/SNF complex subunit SMARCC1 is a protein that in humans is encoded by the SMARCC1 gene.

Function 

The protein encoded by this gene is a member of the SWI/SNF family of proteins, whose members display helicase and ATPase activities and which are thought to regulate transcription of certain genes by altering the chromatin structure around those genes. The encoded protein is part of the large ATP-dependent chromatin remodeling complex SWI/SNF and contains a predicted leucine zipper motif typical of many transcription factors.

Interactions 

SMARCC1 has been shown to interact with:
 BAZ1B, 
 ING1, 
 SIN3A, 
 SMARCA2, 
 SMARCA4, and
 SMARCB1.

References

Further reading

External links